Knight v Indian Head School Division No 19, [1990] 1 S.C.R. 653 is a leading decision of the Supreme Court of Canada on procedural fairness in Canadian administrative law. The Court created a threshold test to determine whether an administrative process invoked a common law duty of fairness based on the nature of the decision, relationship between the parties, and the effect on the individual claimant.

Background
Ronald Gary Knight was dismissed as superintendent of a school board. His position was held at pleasure. His dismissal was not for personal reasons, but he claimed procedural fairness should apply and a hearing should have been held.

3 Prong Test
In order for procedural fairness to apply at common-law, certain requirements must be met. According to L'Heureux-Dubé J. they are:

1. Nature of the decision to be made by the administrative body:
 (a) Administrative vs. Legislative use of power
 Administrative powers attract procedural fairness while legislative powers do not
 (b) Final decision maker
 Preliminary or interlocutory decisions don't invoke procedural fairness

2. Relationship existing between that body and the individual; and
 Exercise of power is pursuant to statute (or prerogative) (executive action)

3. Effect of that decision on the individual's rights (privileges / interests)
 Low threshold requiring only that applicant have an interest and that it be impacted

If all of these criteria are met then procedural fairness is triggered and the court will decide what procedures the applicant is due.

See also
 List of Supreme Court of Canada cases
 Canadian administrative law
 Cardinal v. Director of Kent Institution (1986)

External links
 

Canadian administrative case law
Supreme Court of Canada cases
1990 in Canadian case law
School districts in Canada
Canadian educators